The 2011 NASCAR Sprint Cup Series was the 63rd season of professional stock car racing in the United States and the 40th modern-era Cup series season. The season included 36 races and two exhibition races, beginning with the Daytona 500 at Daytona International Speedway and ending with the Ford 400 at Homestead-Miami Speedway. The final ten races were known as 2011 Chase for the Sprint Cup.

The 2011 season is considered by many to be one of the greatest and most exciting seasons in Cup Series history. It had the closest points battle in history, with Tony Stewart winning the Drivers' Championship with a victory at the final race of the season in a tiebreaker over Carl Edwards due to having five wins on the season vs. Edwards' one win. To much surprise, Stewart, after barely making the Chase that year and having zero wins when the postseason began, went on to win five of the final ten races and then the title over Edwards, who led the points for most of the year despite only scoring one win early in the season at the Las Vegas. There were eighteen different race winners, the most since 2002. There were also five first-time Cup Series winners, most notably Trevor Bayne, the first of those, with his upset win in the Daytona 500 in just his second career Cup race. The other first-time winners were Regan Smith at Darlington, David Ragan at Daytona in July, Paul Menard at Indianapolis, and Marcos Ambrose at Watkins Glen. Some of those races the first-time winners won are also the biggest and most prestigious on the schedule. In addition, Jimmie Johnson's photo finish win over Clint Bowyer at the spring Talladega race became tied (with Ricky Craven's photo finish with Kurt Busch at Darlington in 2003) for the closest finish in the series, and six other races were decided by a margin of 0.059 or fewer.

During the 2010 season, NASCAR announced several calendar changes for 2011, including race additions at Kansas Speedway and Kentucky Speedway, and the removal of one race each from Atlanta Motor Speedway and Auto Club Speedway. Once the 2010 season had concluded, NASCAR also announced changes to the point system, and that the fuel changed from Sunoco unleaded to an ethanol blend called 'Sunoco Green E15'.

In addition, Stewart-Haas Racing, owned by Stewart and Gene Haas, won the Owners' Championship, while Chevrolet won their ninth-consecutive Manufacturers' Championship with 248 points. Stewart became the first owner-driver to win a Cup title since Alan Kulwicki in 1992.

Jimmie Johnson's streak of winning five consecutive Cup Series championships ended in 2011, and he finished sixth in points this season.

Teams and drivers

Complete schedule
There were 41 full-time teams in 2011.

Limited schedule

Team changes
In preparation for 2011, Penske Racing made team changes by moving Brad Keselowski, along with his No. 12 team, into the No. 2 Miller Lite car, replacing Kurt Busch and his 2010 team, who moved to the newly formed No. 22 Shell/Pennzoil car. Another change was made by Hendrick Motorsports, who rearranged three of the four-car team. The team moved Steve Letarte with Dale Earnhardt Jr., Alan Gustafson with Jeff Gordon, and Lance McGrew with Mark Martin.
On January 7, 2011, Bob Leavine and Lance Fenton announced the formation of Leavine Fenton Racing, and that David Starr drove for the team. In February, another team was formed, FAS Lane Racing, by Frank Stoddard. In March, David Stremme announced his return to the Cup Series with a new team, Inception Motorsports. They ran the No. 30 Chevrolet and attempted to make the [[2011 Crown Royal Presents the Matthew and Daniel Hansen 400
|spring race at Richmond]]. In October before the Bank of America 500, it was announced that Sinica Motorsports would join the Cup Series for 3 races in 2011, running the No. 93 Chevrolet with either Bill Elliott or Terry Labonte and that ARCA driver Grant Enfinger would drive for the team for 10–15 races in 2012. (The team only ended up only attempting the season-finale at Homestead with Enfinger in 2011, which they failed to qualify for, and no races in 2012.)

Another new team for 2011, America's Racing Team, was scheduled to debut in the Daytona 500 with their No. 76 Chevrolet. The team was formed in 2010 before the July race at Daytona. The team was unique because fans could pay between $44.95 to $1,999.95 to own a portion of it. However, AMR was unable to get off the ground and they did not attempt any races.

Driver changes

Changed teams
Several drivers changed teams for the season. One of which was Paul Menard, who left Richard Petty Motorsports to drive for Richard Childress Racing. Menard signed a three-year deal to expire at the end of 2013, with options for further years. Other changes were Kasey Kahne who joined the Red Bull Racing Team, after leaving Richard Petty Motorsports in 2010, and Marcos Ambrose who left JTG Daugherty Racing to drive for Richard Petty Motorsports in 2011, as a replacement for Kahne. Also, Bobby Labonte replaced Ambrose at JTG Daugherty Racing, and Bill Elliott, who moved from Wood Brothers Racing to Phoenix Racing. Kevin Conway, the 2010 NASCAR Rookie of the Year in the Sprint Cup Series, also made a change by moving to NEMCO Motorsports.

Entered the series
For the 2011 season, Trevor Bayne, who placed seventh in the 2010 NASCAR Nationwide Series season, entered the series driving for Wood Brothers Racing in 17 scheduled races. Another driver, Brian Keselowski also entered the series, after qualifying for the 2011 Daytona 500 for the K-Automotive Motorsports team.

Exited the series
Some drivers left the series, such as Elliott Sadler who left Richard Petty Motorsports to drive for Kevin Harvick Incorporated in the Camping World Truck Series and Nationwide Series. Sam Hornish Jr. also exited the series and moved to the Nationwide Series to participate in ten races, after new sponsorship for his Sprint Cup Series car could not be found. After the final race of the 2010 season, Scott Speed exited the series after Red Bull Racing Team dismissed him to make room for Kahne. The change resulted in Speed filing a lawsuit against the team for several reasons.

Mid-season changes
During July 2011, Max Q Motorsports announced that Scott Speed signed a three race contract with the team to race at Indianapolis Motor Speedway, Watkins Glen International and Pocono Raceway. Following the announcement, Speed commented, "I am excited to get back to the track. Max Q Motorsports seems to have a good operation and a great group of guys. Ford has a great engine package, so I'm hopeful that we can get the ball rolling quickly and be competitive out the gate. "

Rookie entries
At the beginning of the season, two drivers announced plans to participate in the 2011 Rookie of the Year standings. The drivers were Andy Lally driving for Kevin Buckler's TRG Motorsports, and Brian Keselowski, moving his family-operated K-Automotive Motorsports team up from the Nationwide Series. Trevor Bayne, who was running half the season with the Wood Brothers, did not participate in the standings after deciding to participate for the Nationwide Series championship. T. J. Bell entered later in the season and collected his first Cup points at Pocono. As Lally was the only rookie driver to run the required 17 races to keep eligibility, he won the rookie award easily despite being released from TRG before Homestead.

Changes

Rule changes
After the 2010 season, the catch can man, who caught excess fuel during pit stops and adjusts the track bar, is no longer needed, because of the addition of a self-venting fuel can.  On January 11, 2011, NASCAR reported drivers can only be able to compete for the championship in one of NASCAR's three national racing series, which means the drivers who race in multiple series, most notably in the Cup and Nationwide Series, are able to compete in the races, but not for the championship.

The rule does not affect the exemption rule, as exemptions are determined by the top 35 in NASCAR car owner points. Drivers ineligible for Sprint Cup driver points earned Sprint Cup owner points for their team.

An announcement came on January 26, 2011, when Brian France announced that the winner of the race, excluding bonus points would receive 43 points, and each position lost one point from the position before, so that the first position would receive 43 points, while second would receive 42. For bonus points, if the driver leads a lap they receive one, if they lead the most laps they receive one more, and if they win the race they receive three more points. On the same day, France announced changes to the qualifying format, such as the qualifying order being set by practice speeds from slowest to highest. If qualifying is canceled, the grid would be determined by practice speeds, unless they are also cancelled, then they lined up by Drivers' points. In the press conference, it was also noted that in the Chase for the Sprint Cup, the eleventh and twelfth positions would be awarded to whoever has the most victories who are ranked from 11th to 20th in regular-season driver's points. Those drivers would not be given bonus points for wins. In addition, the number of base points received by Chase drivers at the points reset were set at 2,000 instead of the previous 5,000.

Other changes
During the 2010 season through the off-season, NASCAR announced a change to the front end of the race cars. The change removed the splitter braces, and made it a single molded piece. The fuel for all major series in NASCAR changed from Sunoco unleaded to an ethanol blend called 'Sunoco Green E15'. But during the rest of the season on August 23, Toyota unveiled the new Camry at Paramount Studios, Hollywood, California and the teams changed their headlights, taillights, fog lights, and rear for the rest of the season.

Schedule
On August 18, 2010, the final calendar was released containing 36 races, with the addition of two exhibition races. The schedule also includes two Gatorade Duels, which are the qualifying races for the Daytona 500.

 Race was postponed due to rain.

Calendar changes

For the 2011 season, NASCAR made several changes to the schedule. One change was that the Subway Fresh Fit 600, held at Phoenix International Raceway, was reduced to 500 kilometers, making the name Subway Fresh Fit 500, and it became the second race of the season. Also, the Kobalt Tools 500, held at Atlanta Motor Speedway, was discontinued.  The Auto Club 500 at Auto Club Speedway, was reduced to 400 miles making the name Auto Club 400, and became the fifth race of the season. More changes to the schedule included Kansas Speedway gaining a race (the STP 400), which was run on June 5, 2011, and Kentucky Speedway hosted its first Sprint Cup Series race, the Quaker State 400 on July 9, 2011. The Chase schedule was changed to the GEICO 400 becoming the first race in the Chase for the Sprint Cup; the Sylvania 300 at New Hampshire Motor Speedway was the second, while Auto Club Speedway's Pepsi Max 400 was removed completely from the schedule.

Starting times
Another change for the season involves the races in the Chase for the Sprint Cup, which had different starting times so they would not conflict with the beginning of NFL games. The change was made after seven races during the 2010 season began at 1:00 pm EST, the same time as the NFL games began. The change delayed the start of the first six races, excluding Charlotte, to 2:00 pm EDT, while the last three started at 3:00 pm EST. Charlotte Motor Speedway's race remained on Saturday night. Martinsville Speedway's October race on Halloween weekend featured a 1:30 pm EDT start because the track did not carry lights, and as a result is using the 2004–09 start time of 1:30 pm EDT.  As of 2020, Martinsville Speedway now has lights.

Preseason

The preseason testing season began on January 20, 2011, with a three-day test at the Daytona International Speedway to test the new nose on the car, as well as the new surface. Also in the sessions, the opening of the restrictor plate was reduced from the 30/32 inch plate used in tire testing in December to 29/32 inch. NASCAR vice president for competition Robin Pemberton stated, "We'll have to get back and talk to the teams and look at the speeds from the last two days of testing. I think we have some high-water marks at 197-and-a-half which, depending on where they pulled up in the draft, it may be a little quick, but it's hard to say." During the first session on the morning of January 20, 2011, 33 drivers participated, and Clint Bowyer was quickest with a speed of 184.216 mph while David Reutimann had the highest speed of 195.780 mph during the second session in the afternoon.

The third test session, scheduled for the morning of January 21, was canceled because of wet weather. During the fourth session, held during the afternoon, 34 drivers participated with Denny Hamlin being quickest with a speed of 196.868 mph. Several drivers decided to leave after the session, which included Reutimann, Martin Truex Jr., Jimmie Johnson, and Bowyer. During the fifth session, held on the morning of January 22, 29 drivers participated, and Joey Logano was quickest with a speed of 197.516 mph. Brad Keselowski was quickest with a speed of 198.605 mph in the final session. Once the testing concluded, NASCAR managing director of competition John Darby commented that he did not expect to change the restrictor plate that they used in the January test sessions, leaving the opening at 29/32 inches.

Report

In the first exhibition race of the season, the 2011 Budweiser Shootout, Hamlin crossed the finished line in the first position, but since he passed below the yellow out of bounds line, Kurt Busch became the winner of the race. Trevor Bayne won the opening race of the season in the Daytona 500 after David Ragan received a penalty for a restart violation, with Bayne becoming just the fifth driver to win the race for Wood Brothers Racing and the youngest ever to win the Daytona 500 at 20 years and 1 day, as well as the first driver to win the race (excluding the inaugural 1959 race) in his first Daytona 500 start. Four-time champion, Jeff Gordon claimed victory in the 2011 Subway Fresh Fit 500 at Phoenix International Raceway, after leading the most laps of 138, ending a 66-race winless streak.

Next, Carl Edwards won the 2011 Kobalt Tools 400 after Tony Stewart, who led the most laps, was penalized on pit road. After winning the Nationwide race on Saturday, Kyle Busch held off Carl Edwards and Jimmie Johnson to take his fifth consecutive Bristol victory. Though Kyle dominated the race, Jimmie Johnson took the lead briefly but was passed on the last lap by Kevin Harvick, who took his first win of 2011 at Auto Club Speedway. The following week, Harvick passed fan favorite Dale Earnhardt Jr. with four laps to go to win at Martinsville Speedway. Roush Fenway Racing dominated the weekend at Texas Motor Speedway, with Matt Kenseth leading 169 laps en route to his first victory in 76 races.

In the Aaron's 499 Jimmie Johnson edged Clint Bowyer for the win at Talladega Superspeedway by .002 seconds, tying the closest finish in series history. For the third consecutive season, Kyle Busch dominated the spring race at Richmond, leading 293 of 400 laps en route to his second win of the season After being denied victory at Talladega in 2008, Regan Smith stayed out on older tires and held of points leader Carl Edwards for his and Furniture Row Racing's first Cup Series victory at Darlington Raceway. Making a last minute two-tire pit stop on the final pit stop, Matt Kenseth outran former teammate Mark Martin to take his second win of the season at Dover.

At the second exhibition race of the season, the NASCAR Sprint All-Star Race XXVII at Charlotte Motor Speedway, David Ragan and Brad Keselowski finished 1–2 in the Sprint Showdown, while fan favorite Dale Earnhardt Jr. won the fan vote to transfer into the main event. Carl Edwards dominated the final two segments and held off Kyle Busch for his first All-Star victory. With the teams remaining in Charlotte for the Coca-Cola 600, Dale Earnhardt Jr. came close to snapping his winless drought by gambling on fuel, but ran out of gas on the backstretch, allowing Kevin Harvick to drive to his 3rd win of 2011. At 402 laps and 603 miles, the race was the longest in NASCAR history. At the inaugural STP 400 at Kansas Speedway, a dominant Kurt Busch was forced to stop for fuel with 7 laps to go, allowing teammate Brad Keselowski to take the lead and hold off a charging Dale Earnhardt Jr. for his second Sprint Cup victory. At the 5-hour Energy 500, a quick final pit stop enabled Jeff Gordon to beat polesitter Kurt Busch out of the pits, getting Gordon his 84th Sprint Cup victory, tying Bobby Allison and Darrell Waltrip for third on the all-time wins list and also tying Waltrip for the most wins in NASCAR's modern era. The next week at Michigan, defending race winner Denny Hamlin got an excellent final pit stop, enabling him to hold off Matt Kenseth for his first win of the season. The next week at Infineon Raceway, Kurt Busch dominated the race and easily held off Jeff Gordon for his first win of 2011 and first on a road course.

The series returned to Daytona for the Independence Day weekend. Daytona 500 winner Trevor Bayne crashed out early, and David Ragan with help from teammate Matt Kenseth, rebounded from his late 500 loss to take his first Sprint Cup victory. The following week, at the inaugural Quaker State 400 at Kentucky Speedway, Kyle Busch dominated the race and held off a hard charging David Reutimann for his third win of the season. Heading up to New England for the Lenox Industrial Tools 301 at Loudon, Ryan Newman and Tony Stewart, both drivers for Stewart-Haas Racing started first and second on the grid, and the two remained in the same order at the conclusion of the race, Newman's his first win of season. After an off week, the series made its way to the prestigious Indianapolis Motor Speedway for the Brickyard 400. Though Jeff Gordon had the dominant car, pit strategy got Paul Menard out front and eventually hold off a hard-charging Gordon for his first career Sprint Cup victory.

The series returned to Pocono for the Good Sam RV Insurance 500. The Joe Gibbs Racing trio of Denny Hamlin, Kyle Busch, and Joey Logano dominated the race, but Brad Keselowski, racing injured from a crash at Road Atlanta, held off Busch with 10 to go to take his second win of the year. The next week at Watkins Glen, Cup drivers returned to road course racing, and Marcos Ambrose held off Brad Keselowski and Kyle Busch in a green-white-checker finish and avoided several violent crashes, including David Reutimann flipping in the esses on the final lap, to claim his first Sprint Cup Series win, becoming the fifth first-time winner in 2011. Ambrose also became the first Australian ever (and fourth foreign-born driver) to win a Cup Series race. The series returned to Michigan for the Pure Michigan 400, and Kyle Busch would dominate the race and hold off Jimmie Johnson for his fourth win of 2011. Heading to Bristol for the Irwin Tools Night Race, Jeff Gordon and Matt Kenseth dominated the race, but Brad Keselowski got out front after a fast final pitstop and held off Martin Truex Jr. for his third win of 2011.

Heading to Atlanta Motor Speedway for the Labor Day weekend, the race was pushed to Tuesday September 6 due to Tropical Storm Lee dumping rain on the Southwest Sunday and Monday. When the race resumed, Jeff Gordon held off Hendrick Motorsports teammate Jimmie Johnson for his 3rd win of 2011 and his 85th overall win in the Cup Series. At the Wonderful Pistachios 400, the last race of the regular season was hotly contested with multiple drivers needing a win to break into the Chase. Kevin Harvick would end up holding off the field for his 4th win of 2011 while Denny Hamlin and Brad Keselowski completed the two wild card spots in the top 12. For the first time, Chicagoland Speedway was the site of the Chase opener. With the race delayed until Monday due to rain, Tony Stewart held off a hard-charging Kevin Harvick and outlasted the field on fuel to take his first win of 2011. The teams headed up north to return to New Hampshire Motor Speedway for the Sylvania 300. Once again, the race came down to fuel mileage as Tony Stewart passed Clint Bowyer with 2 laps to go and held on for his second consecutive win of the year. In the series' return to Dover, Jimmie Johnson dominated the race, but Kurt Busch took advantage of a restart and held off Johnson for his second win of 2011. Heading to Kansas, Jimmie Johnson once again dominated the race, but sealed up his second win of the season on a Green-white-checkered finish by holding off Kasey Kahne.

The series returned to Charlotte for the halfway mark of the Chase. Kyle Busch dominated the race, but Matt Kenseth passed Busch late in the race and held him off for his third win of 2011. During the Good Sam Club 500 at Talladega, the controversial two-car draft dominated the race, as the RCR duo of Jeff Burton and Clint Bowyer pulled away from the field on a late restart, though Bowyer would pass Burton on the final lap and beat him to the line by a fender for his second consecutive fall Talladega win. The teams returned to Martinsville for the final short track of the season. There, the Chase drivers had up and down days, but Tony Stewart passed Jimmie Johnson on the final restart to grab his third win of 2011 and keep his Chase hopes alive. Returning to Texas, Stewart dominated and passed  a gambling Jeff Burton with 5 to go to hold off points leader Carl Edwards for his fourth win in 2011.

At the penultimate race in Phoenix, the drivers face a completely new Phoenix International Raceway. Stewart dominated once again, but Kasey Kahne held off a hard-charging Carl Edwards to snap an 81 race winless streak. At the season finale, championship contenders Edwards and Stewart dominated the race with a razor-thin points gap, but Stewart prevailed and took home both his fifth win of 2011 and defeated Edwards for his first Cup championship as an owner-driver (Stewart and Edwards were tied in points after the race; Stewart prevailed on the first tie-breaker, number of race wins during the season – Stewart had five wins during the season (all during the Chase) while Edwards had only one win in the third race of the season). 2011 saw 5 drivers win their 1st ever Sprint Cup race (Trevor Bayne, Regan Smith, David Ragan, Paul Menard, and Marcos Ambrose). 2011 also saw 19 different drivers winning at least one race. 2011 matched 2001 with both modern era record accomplishments.

Results and standings

Races

Drivers

(key) Bold – Pole position awarded by time. Italics – Pole position set by final practice results. * – Most laps led.

 Kyle Busch was suspended from competing in the second Texas race due to crashing out championship contender Ron Hornaday Jr. during a caution at the 2011 WinStar World Casino 350K earlier that weekend. He was replaced by Michael McDowell.

Manufacturer

See also

 2011 NASCAR Nationwide Series
 2011 NASCAR Camping World Truck Series
 2011 ARCA Racing Series
 2011 NASCAR Canadian Tire Series
 2011 NASCAR Corona Series
 2011 NASCAR Stock V6 Series

References

 
NASCAR Cup Series seasons